Dino Nicolas Toppmöller (born 23 November 1980) is a German football manager and former player. He is an assistant coach with Bayern Munich.

Managerial career
In June 2016, Toppmöller became manager of F91 Dudelange, having taken them to the Group Stages of the UEFA Europa League for the first time in the club's history in 2018–19, campaign which F91 Dudelange have finished with one point following a draw in their last game against Real Betis. This feat made history in Luxembourg's football history, as Dudelange were not just the first team to have ever qualified in the group stages of any European competition, but they also managed to obtain a point. He joined Belgian outfit Virton following that season, having spent a brief stint with them before being released after just one season.

On 20 July 2020, he was introduced as assistant coach to Julian Nagelsmann at RB Leipzig. On 18 June 2021, he followed coach Nagelsmann to be his assistant at Bayern Munich.

Personal life
He is the son of Klaus Toppmöller. He was named after Dino Zoff.

References

External links
 

Living people
1980 births
Association football midfielders
German footballers
1. FC Saarbrücken players
Manchester City F.C. players
VfL Bochum players
VfL Bochum II players
Eintracht Frankfurt players
FC Erzgebirge Aue players
SSV Jahn Regensburg players
Kickers Offenbach players
FC Augsburg players
F91 Dudelange players
2. Bundesliga players
F91 Dudelange managers
FC Bayern Munich non-playing staff